Zacco acutipinnis is a species of cyprinid of the genus Zacco. It inhabits southern China and has a maximum length of  among unsexed males. Described in 1871 by Pieter Bleeker, it is considered harmless to humans. It has 10 dorsal soft rays, 12 anal soft rays and 39-41 vertebrae and has not been classified on the IUCN Red List.

References

Cyprinid fish of Asia
Freshwater fish of China
Fish described in 1871